"Oh Diane" is a song by British-American rock group Fleetwood Mac. It was written by guitarist Lindsey Buckingham and Richard Dashut for the 1982 album Mirage, the fourth album by the band with Lindsey Buckingham as producer.

Background
Despite the previous two singles from the album ("Hold Me" and "Gypsy") being unsuccessful in the United Kingdom, the song became a hit there when released in December 1982. It charted at number 69 on 18 December 1982 and took 10 weeks to gradually climb the chart, peaking at number 9 in February 1983, helping to push its parent album Mirage into the Top 10.

The sleeve for "Oh Diane" saw the band return to using the penguin trademark in a nod to the band's earlier years; their 1973 album was called Penguin. "Oh Diane" was released in Britain on 7" and 12" and also as a 7" picture disc of the penguin design.

In the USA, another track from Mirage, "Love in Store", was released as the third single instead and was a moderate success. "Oh Diane" was therefore the fourth single issued in the US; it was released in February 1983, but failed to chart. However, it did become a minor hit on the American Adult Contemporary chart, peaking at number 35. Despite being a Top 10 hit in the UK, "Oh Diane" does not appear on the 2002 UK version of the album, The Very Best of Fleetwood Mac (or the 2009 re-issue), although it was included on 2018's 50 Years – Don't Stop.

Personnel
Lindsey Buckingham – electric guitar, acoustic guitar, keyboards, lead and backing vocals
Mick Fleetwood – drums, tambourine
John McVie – bass guitar
Christine McVie – backing vocals

Track listings

In the UK, "Oh Diane" was released as the band’s first 12” single featuring the additional b-side track "The Chain" from the 1977 album Rumours.

UK 7" single (Warner Brothers Records FLEET 1)

 "Oh Diane" – 2:33
 "Only Over You" – 4:08

UK 12" single (Warner Brothers Records FLEET 1)

 "Oh Diane” – 2:33
 "Only Over You” – 4:08
 "The Chain" – 4:28

US 7" single (Warner Brothers Records 7-29698)

 "Oh Diane" – 2:33
 "That’s Alright" – 3:09

Chart positions

References

External links
Official Site.

1982 singles
Fleetwood Mac songs
Music videos directed by Russell Mulcahy
Song recordings produced by Richard Dashut
Songs written by Lindsey Buckingham
1982 songs
Warner Records singles
Songs written by Richard Dashut